This is a list of members of the Northern Territory Legislative Council from 29 May 1954 to 23 January 1957.

The council consisted of 14 members. Six members were elected to four single-member electorates (Alice Springs, Batchelor, Stuart and Tennant Creek), and one two-member electorate (Darwin). Seven members (called Official Members) were appointed by the Australian government, all of whom were senior public servants in the Northern Territory. The Administrator of the Northern Territory, Frank Wise and later James Archer, served as presiding officer (or president) of the council.

 The Labor member for Batchelor, Tom Ronan, resigned on 5 April 1955, unhappy with the conditions for members of the council. The Administrator, Frank Wise, called the Territory's first by-election (previous casual vacancies had been filled by appointment or left vacant until the next general election) for 6 August. Harold "Tiger" Brennan, who Ronan had defeated by only three votes at the 1954 election, won the by-election with a comfortable majority against the Labor candidate Alfred Forscutt. On 5 December 1955, Brennan resigned from the council in a public protest over the federal government ordering its official members to vote against a bill legalising off-course gambling. Another by-election was called for Batchelor, and Brennan returned to the council when he was unopposed at the close of nominations on 13 February 1956.

See also
1954 Northern Territory general election

References

Members of Northern Territory parliaments by term
Members of the Northern Territory Legislative Council